Theresa Zabell Lucas (born 22 May 1965 in Ipswich, Suffolk) is a Spanish sailor who won gold medal both in the 1992 Summer Olympics in Barcelona, and in the 1996 Summer Olympics in Atlanta, Georgia. A member of Real Club de Mediterráneo Málaga she competes in the 470 class.

Theresa Zabell is a sister of artist Simon Zabell.

Notes

References

External links
 
 
 
 

1965 births
Living people
Spanish female sailors (sport)
Olympic sailors of Spain
Olympic medalists in sailing
Olympic gold medalists for Spain
Sailors at the 1992 Summer Olympics – 470
Sailors at the 1996 Summer Olympics – 470
Medalists at the 1992 Summer Olympics
Medalists at the 1996 Summer Olympics
ISAF World Sailor of the Year (female)
470 class world champions
World champions in sailing for Spain
Sportspeople from Ipswich
Competitors at the 1993 Mediterranean Games
Mediterranean Games gold medalists for Spain